X Games XVI was an action sporting event which took place from July 29 – August 1, 2010 in Los Angeles, California at the Staples Center, L.A. Live and the Los Angeles Memorial Coliseum. The games featured the sports of Motocross, skateboarding, BMX, and rallying.

Results

Motocross

*Competition decided by fan text message voting.

Skateboarding

*Finalists determined by a best-video contest.

BMX

Rallying

Highlights
Deaf rider Ashley Fiolek wins her second consecutive gold medal in Women's Moto X Super X.
Travis Pastrana completes a Double Backflip and wins the gold medal in Freestyle Moto X after a three-year hiatus from the event.
Cam Sinclair completes a Double Backflip and wins the gold medal in Moto X Best Trick, coming back from a devastating accident which left him in a coma for 7 days.
Three time defending Moto X Best Trick gold medalist Kyle Loza withdraws from the competition with an injury.
Paris Rosen crashes while attempting to complete a Front Flip in Moto X Best Trick and has to be carried away on a stretcher.
Jake Brown and Bob Burnquist each attempt to complete the first 900 in a Skateboard Big Air competition. Both fail, and Brown wins his second consecutive gold medal.
Pierre-Luc Gagnon wins his third consecutive gold medal in Skateboard Vert.
15-year-old Nyjah Huston wins the silver medal in Skateboard Street.
15-year-old Pedro Barros beats out 37-year-old Andy Macdonald for the gold medal in Skateboard Park. 14-year-old Curren Caples places 4th.
Jamie Bestwick wins his fourth consecutive gold medal in BMX Freestyle Vert.
Garrett Reynolds wins his third consecutive gold medal in BMX Freestyle Street.
In the elimination round of BMX Freestyle Street, Sean Burns jumps out of the arena, dropping down the concrete below.
Travis Pastrana crashes in the quarterfinal round of Rally Car Racing, eliminating him from the competition and forcing him to withdraw from Rally Car Super Rally.

References

External links
XGames.com

X Games in Los Angeles
2010 in American sports
2010 in rallying
2010 in multi-sport events
2010 in sports in California